Chernovsky (masculine), Chernovskaya (feminine), or Chernovskoye (neuter) is the name of several rural localities in Russia:
Chernovsky, Republic of Bashkortostan, a village in Krasnoyarsky Selsoviet of Ufimsky District of the Republic of Bashkortostan
Chernovsky, Oryol Oblast, a settlement in Titovsky Selsoviet of Shablykinsky District of Oryol Oblast
Chernovsky, Oblivsky District, Rostov Oblast, a khutor in Nesterkinskoye Rural Settlement of Oblivsky District of Rostov Oblast
Chernovsky, Sholokhovsky District, Rostov Oblast, a khutor in Kolundayevskoye Rural Settlement of Sholokhovsky District of Rostov Oblast
Chernovsky, Ryazan Oblast, a settlement under the administrative jurisdiction of  the work settlement of Yelatma, Kasimovsky District, Ryazan Oblast
Chernovsky, Samara Oblast, a settlement in Volzhsky District of Samara Oblast
Chernovsky, Volgograd Oblast, a khutor in Pristenovsky Selsoviet of Chernyshkovsky District of Volgograd Oblast
Chernovskoye, Chelyabinsk Oblast, a selo under the administrative jurisdiction of the city of Miass, Chelyabinsk Oblast
Chernovskoye, Kirov Oblast, a selo in Chernovsky Rural Okrug of Shabalinsky District of Kirov Oblast
Chernovskoye, Leningrad Oblast, a logging depot settlement in Chernovskoye Settlement Municipal Formation of Slantsevsky District of Leningrad Oblast
Chernovskoye, Bolsheboldinsky District, Nizhny Novgorod Oblast, a selo in Chernovskoy Selsoviet of Bolsheboldinsky District of Nizhny Novgorod Oblast
Chernovskoye, Vachsky District, Nizhny Novgorod Oblast, a village in Filinsky Selsoviet of Vachsky District of Nizhny Novgorod Oblast
Chernovskoye, Perm Krai, a selo in Bolshesosnovsky District of Perm Krai
Chernovskaya, Ivanovo Oblast, a village in Pestyakovsky District of Ivanovo Oblast
Chernovskaya, Vladimir Oblast, a village in Selivanovsky District of Vladimir Oblast
Chernovskaya, Vologda Oblast, a village in Nizhneslobodsky Selsoviet of Vozhegodsky District of Vologda Oblast